Pedro Martins (born 12 January 1968) is a Portuguese race walker.

Achievements

References

1968 births
Living people
Portuguese male racewalkers
Athletes (track and field) at the 2000 Summer Olympics
Athletes (track and field) at the 2004 Summer Olympics
Olympic athletes of Portugal